Kunio (written: 邦夫, 邦男, 邦雄, 邦生, 國男, 國士, 国男, 国夫, 州男 or 久仁生) is a masculine Japanese given name. Notable people with the name include:

, Japanese businessman
, Japanese businessman
, Japanese judge
, Japanese politician
, Japanese mayor
, Japanese Go player
, Japanese field hockey player
, Japanese animator
, Japanese dramatist and writer
Kunio Kitamura (born 1968), Japanese footballer
Kunio Kobayashi (born 1967), Japanese karateka
Kunio Lemari (1942–2008), Marshallese politician and President of the Marshall Islands
, Japanese architect
, Japanese photographer
, Japanese actor and voice actor (not to be confused with the manga character of the same name)
, Japanese politician
, Japanese general
, Japanese businessman
, Japanese footballer
, Japanese writer
, Japanese mechanical designer
, Japanese cross-country skier
Kunio Shimizu (born 1934), Japanese playwright
, Japanese writer
Kunio Yamazaki (died 2013), Japanese biologist
, Japanese folklorist and ethnologist
, Japanese water polo player
, Japanese shogi player

Fictional characters
Kunio Yamagata, a character in the manga series Miss Machiko
, a character in the manga/anime Great Teacher Onizuka (not to be confused with the actor of the same name)
Kunio, the title character of Kunio-kun, a Japanese video game franchise

Japanese masculine given names